Abriesa is a monotypic moth genus of the family Erebidae. Its only species, Abriesa derna, is found in Queensland, Australia. Both the genus and the species were first described by Charles Swinhoe in 1900.

References

Calpinae
Monotypic moth genera
Noctuoidea genera